Borås AIK is a Swedish football club located in Borås.

Background
Borås AIK currently plays in Division 5 Västergötland Mellersta which is the seventh tier of Swedish football. They play their home matches at the Bodavallen in Borås.

The club is affiliated to Västergötlands Fotbollförbund. Borås AIK played in the 2006 Svenska Cupen but lost 0–3 away to FK Jat in the first round.

Season to season

In their most successful period Borås AIK competed in the following divisions:

In recent seasons Borås AIK have competed in the following divisions:

Footnotes

External links
 Borås AIK – Official website

Sport in Borås
Football clubs in Västra Götaland County
1953 establishments in Sweden
Association football clubs established in 1953